Red Sky at Morning may refer to:

"Red sky at morning", part of a common verse meant to help predict weather

Film
Red Sky at Morning (1971 film), a film based on the Bradford novel
Red Sky at Morning (1944 film), a drama by Australian author Dymphna Cusack

Literature
 Red Sky at Morning (Kennedy novel), a 1927 novel by Margaret Kennedy
Red Sky at Morning (Bradford novel), a 1968 novel by Richard Bradford
Red Sky at Morning (Speth book), a 2004 book by James Gustave Speth

Other uses
"Red Sky at Morning" (Supernatural), an episode of the television series Supernatural

See also
 Red Sky in the Morning, 1935 book by Robert P. T. Coffin
 Red in the Morning, 1946 novel by Dornford Yates
 Red Sky in the Morning, 1988 novel by Elizabeth Laird
 Red sky at night (disambiguation)
 Crimson Dawn (disambiguation)
 Red Dawn (disambiguation)